The 2012 Moldovan Super Cup was the sixth Moldovan Super Cup, an annual Moldovan football match played by the winner of the national football league (the National Division) and the winner of the national Cup. The match was played between Sheriff Tiraspol, champions of the 2011–12 National Division, and Milsami Orhei, winners of the 2011–12 Moldovan Cup. It was held at the Sheriff Stadium on 8 July 2012.

Milsami Orhei won 6–5 on penalties, after the match finished 0–0 after 90 minutes.

Match

References

2012–13 in Moldovan football
FC Milsami Orhei matches
FC Sheriff Tiraspol matches
Moldovan Super Cup
Association football penalty shoot-outs